The Thuile locomotive was a steam locomotive designed by Monsieur Thuile, of Alexandria, Egypt, and built in 1899.

History
Thuile proposed a 6-4-8 or 6-4-6 locomotive with 3-metre-diameter driving wheels, but this was not built.

The design was taken up by Schneider, of Le Creusot, who built a 4-4-6 with 2.5-metre-diameter driving wheels, and a forward cab for the driver. The two-cylinder locomotive had Walschaerts valve gear and a double-lobed boiler of nickel-steel. The locomotive was exhibited at the International Exposition in Paris in 1900, and the trials were undertaken on the Chemin de Fer de l'Etat line between Chartres and Thouars.

The trials ended when Thuile was killed in June 1900 - apparently by leaning too far out of the locomotive and being in collision with a lineside pole. The locomotive was returned to Schneider. It was scrapped in 1904. The tender survived until at least 1946, when it was noted at Saint Pierre-des-Corps.

References

4-4-6 locomotives
Individual locomotives of France
Steam locomotives of France
Railway locomotives introduced in 1899
Standard gauge locomotives of France
Scrapped locomotives